Pascal Strebel (born 26 December 1988 in Muri) is a Swiss Greco-Roman wrestler. He competed in the -66kg event at the 2012 Summer Olympics in London, where he was eliminated in the first round.

References

External links
 

1988 births
Living people
Swiss wrestlers
Wrestlers at the 2012 Summer Olympics
Olympic wrestlers of Switzerland